Stand by Me is a 1998 Singaporean Mandarin drama series which aired on MediaCorp TV Channel 8 (then known as TCS - Television Corporation of Singapore) in April 1998. The serial garnered favourable responses from the audience during its telecast with its touching and heart-rending storyline, and also with critically acclaimed acting from the cast.

It won the Best Drama Serial award at the Star Awards 1998. Xie Shaoguang and Huang Bi Ren were also awarded the Best Actor and Best Actress awards respectively.

Kok Len Shoong (郭令送) is the producer of the drama.

Synopsis
The drama series stars Xie Shaoguang as the main character Du Hanmin (杜汉民), an ex-doctor and then a paraplegic who once had an affair. Huang Biren plays the role of a caring and patient wife of Du, Terence Cao plays an incorrigible gambler, May Phua plays his sister who is on adversarial terms with him, Deborah Sim plays Cao's character love interest, and Joey Swee plays Du's former mistress.

Cast
 Xie Shaoguang as Du Hanmin (杜汉民)
 Terence Cao 
 Huang Biren
 May Phua
 Deborah Sim
 Chen Shucheng
 Ding Lan

Nominations

External links
Stand By Me website

Stand By Me
1990s Singaporean television series
1998 Singaporean television series debuts
1998 Singaporean television series endings
Channel 8 (Singapore) original programming